Gary Clark Jr. (born November 16, 1994) is an American professional basketball player for the Capitanes de Ciudad de México of the NBA G League. He played college basketball for the Cincinnati Bearcats. He was named the American Athletic Conference Player of the Year for the 2017–18 season.

High school career
Clark, a  power forward, played basketball at Clayton High School in Clayton, North Carolina, where he left as the school's all-time leading scorer, rebounder and shot-blocker. He is also the only North Carolina high school player to record a quadruple-double. Clark was ranked as the No. 100 overall prospect by ESPN, No. 87 by Rivals and No. 90 by 247sports. He committed to Cincinnati on September 18, 2013 after receiving a scholarship offer from NC State.

College career
Clark made an immediate impact for Cincinnati, entering the starting lineup from day one and becoming the first freshman to start a season opener for the program since Lance Stephenson. At the close of the American Athletic Conference (AAC) season, he was named to the league's all-rookie team. Clark posted 7.8 points, 7.2 rebounds, 1.0 steal and 1.3 blocks per game as a freshman.

In his sophomore season, Clark developed into one of the top defensive players in the AAC. After averaging 10.4 points, 8.8 rebounds, 1.2 steals and 1.5 blocks per game, he was named second-team All-AAC and the conference Defensive Player of the Year. Prior to his junior year, Clark was named to the preseason All-AAC first team. He averaged 10.8 points and 7.9 rebounds per game as a junior.

At the close of his senior season, Clark was named AAC Player of the Year and Defensive Player of the Year. He averaged 12.7 points, 8.0 rebounds, and 1.3 blocks per game. Clark led Cincinnati to an AAC regular season title. He was the AAC tournament Most Outstanding Player after averaging 16.3 points and 11.7 rebounds in the conference tournament. Clark hit a game-winning free throw with four seconds in regulation to secure a 56–55 victory for the Bearcats in the title game.

Professional career

Houston Rockets (2018–2020)
After going undrafted in the 2018 NBA draft, Clark signed with the Houston Rockets. Clark made his NBA debut on October 17, 2018, in a 112–131 blowout loss to the New Orleans Pelicans. Clark was originally signed to a two-way contract, but on December 6, 2018 it was converted to a standard deal. On January 7, 2020, the Rockets announced that they had waived Clark.

Orlando Magic (2020–2021)
On January 14, 2020, the Orlando Magic announced that they had signed Clark to a 10-day contract. The Magic signed him to a second 10-day contract on January 29, and signed for rest of season on February 8. On November 23, 2020, the Magic announced that they had re-signed Clark.

Denver Nuggets (2021)
On March 25, 2021, Clark and Aaron Gordon were traded to the Denver Nuggets in exchange for Gary Harris, R. J. Hampton and a future first round pick. On April 9, he was waived after making two appearances.

Philadelphia 76ers (2021)
On May 11, 2021, Clark signed a two-way contract with the Philadelphia 76ers.

Capitanes de Ciudad de México (2021)
On November 5, 2021, Clark signed with the Capitanes de Ciudad de México of the NBA G League. In eight games, he averaged 14.4 points, 6.9 rebounds, and 1.1 assists in 31.3 minutes per contest.

New Orleans Pelicans (2021–2022)
On December 3, 2021, Clark signed with the New Orleans Pelicans, becoming the first Capitanes' player ever to receive an NBA call-up. On January 7, 2022, he was waived by the Pelicans. Two days later, he re-signed with the Pelicans on a two-way contract.

Return to Capitanes de Ciudad de México (2022–present)
On November 4, 2022, Clark was named to the opening night roster for the Capitanes de Ciudad de México.

Career statistics

NBA

Regular season

|-
| style="text-align:left;"| 
| style="text-align:left;"| Houston
| 51 || 2 || 12.6 || .331 || .297 || 1.000 || 2.3 || .4 || .4 || .5 || 2.9
|-
| style="text-align:left;"| 
| style="text-align:left;"| Houston
| 18 || 0 || 11.8 || .390 || .353 || .857 || 2.2 || .7 || .1 || .4 || 3.9
|-
| style="text-align:left;"| 
| style="text-align:left;"| Orlando
| 24 || 5 || 14.8 || .419 || .350 || 1.000 || 2.9 || .2 || .2 || .6 || 3.6
|-
| style="text-align:left;"| 
| style="text-align:left;"| Orlando
| 35 || 11 || 18.2 || .305 || .287 || .800 || 3.2 || .9 || .3 || .2 || 3.4
|-
| style="text-align:left;"| 
| style="text-align:left;"| Denver
| 2 || 0 || 2.0 ||  ||  ||  || .5 || .0 || .0 || .0 || 0.0
|-
| style="text-align:left;"| 
| style="text-align:left;"| Philadelphia
| 2 || 0 || 6.5 || .000 || .000 ||  || 1.0 || .5 || .5 || .0 || 0.0
|-
| style="text-align:left;"| 
| style="text-align:left;"| New Orleans
| 38 || 1 || 9.9 || .375 || .400 || .700 || 2.4 || .5 || .3 || .2 || 2.7
|- class="sortbottom"
| style="text-align:center;" colspan="2"| Career
| 170 || 19 || 13.2 || .351 || .326 || .838 || 2.5 || .5 || .3 || .4 || 3.1

Playoffs

|-
| style="text-align:left;"| 2019
| style="text-align:left;"| Houston
| 2 || 0 || 2.0 || – || – || – || .5 || .0 || .0 || .0 || .0
|-
| style="text-align:left;"| 2020
| style="text-align:left;"| Orlando
| 5 || 5 || 28.8 || .333 || .344 || .800 || 5.6 || 1.4 || 1.0 || .4 || 7.4
|- class="sortbottom"
| style="text-align:center;" colspan="2"| Career
| 7 || 5 || 21.1 || .333 || .344 || .800 || 4.1 || 1.0 || .7 || .3 || 5.3

College

|-
| style="text-align:left;"| 2014–15
| style="text-align:left;"| Cincinnati
| 34 || 34 || 27.8 || .524 || .000 || .625 || 7.2 || 1.7 || 1.0 || 1.3 || 7.8
|-
| style="text-align:left;"| 2015–16
| style="text-align:left;"| Cincinnati
| 33 || 32 || 30.4 || .519 || .520 || .687 || 8.8 || 2.1 || 1.2 || 1.5 || 10.4
|-
| style="text-align:left;"| 2016–17
| style="text-align:left;"| Cincinnati
| 36 || 35 || 28.6 || .529 || .286 || .697 || 7.9 || 2.1 || 1.0 || 1.2 || 10.8
|-
| style="text-align:left;"| 2017–18
| style="text-align:left;"| Cincinnati
| 36 || 36 || 28.5 || .526 || .435 || .741 || 8.7 || 2.1 || 1.4 || 1.2 || 12.9
|- class="sortbottom"
| style="text-align:center;" colspan="2"| Career
| 139 || 137 || 28.8 || .525 || .383 || .698 || 8.1 || 2.0 || 1.2 || 1.3 || 10.5

References

External links

Cincinnati Bearcats bio
College stats @ sports-reference.com

1994 births
Living people
21st-century African-American sportspeople
African-American basketball players
American expatriate basketball people in Mexico
American men's basketball players
Basketball players from North Carolina
Capitanes de Ciudad de México players
Cincinnati Bearcats men's basketball players
Denver Nuggets players
Houston Rockets players
New Orleans Pelicans players
Orlando Magic players
People from Clayton, North Carolina
People from Smithfield, North Carolina
Philadelphia 76ers players
Power forwards (basketball)
Rio Grande Valley Vipers players
Undrafted National Basketball Association players
United States men's national basketball team players